WisdomTree, Inc. is a New York-based exchange-traded fund (ETF) and exchange-traded product (ETP) sponsor and asset manager. WisdomTree launched its first ETFs in June 2006, and became one of the major ETF providers in the United States. WisdomTree sponsors different ETFs that span asset classes and countries worldwide. Categories include: U.S. and International Equity, Currency, Fixed Income and Alternatives. 

WisdomTree's largest ETF in terms of AUM is the WisdomTree Europe Hedged Equity Fund , which had over $20.39 billion on December 28, 2015. The ETFs invests in European equities but hedges out currency risks due to the changing exchange rates between the US Dollar and the euro. WisdomTree manages approximately $44.5 billion in ETF assets under management, as of February 23, 2016. The WisdomTree common stock is listed on the NASDAQ Global Select Market under the ticker: .

Company information 

WisdomTree uses index-based funds to employ a weighted investment methodology, which weights securities on the basis of factors such as dividends or earnings, rather than using market capitalization. According to WisdomTree, their utilization of a "differentiated" approach, employing a distinctive index-based methodology, helps deliver better risk-adjusted returns in long term. The dividend-focused strategy is influenced by professor Jeremy Siegel's research showing dividend-paying companies tend to offer superior long-term performance with lower risk.

WisdomTree offered 14 different ETFs as of 2013, that are transparently managed on a daily basis. WisdomTree's relief enables the company to use its own indexes for certain ETFs, actively manage other ETFs and incorporate the use of derivatives in certain products, a process that allows the company to develop unique ETFs. As of 2017, WisdomTree Investments had subsidiaries in US, Canada, Europe and Japan.

History 
WisdomTree, Inc. was incorporated by its chief executive officer and founder, Jonathan Steinberg, in Delaware as Financial Data Systems, Inc., on September 19, 1985. The company was inactive until October 1988 when it acquired the assets relating to what would become Individual Investor magazine, a monthly personal finance magazine.

In December 1991, it completed an initial public offering and commenced trading on the Nasdaq Stock Market (NASDAQ). In 1993, the company's name was changed to Individual Investor Group, Inc. and throughout the 1990s it was a financial media company that published several magazines, including Individual Investor and Ticker, newsletters, as well as maintaining several online financial related websites. In addition, the company also began developing stock indexes.

Due to the economic downturn in the financial media industry in 2000 and 2001, the company sold its media properties in order to preserve its capital while it pursued a new business plan focusing on developing and licensing its stock indexes. The company's common stock was delisted from NASDAQ and began quotation on the over-the-counter market.

In 2002, the company's name was changed to Index Development Partners, Inc., and Jonathan Steinberg, along with Rayne Steinberg and Luciano Siracusano, continued development of the concepts for the company's fundamentally weighted index methodology. While this concept was being developed, the company sought to obtain financing to recapitalize and become an ETF sponsor.

Between 2004 and 2005, the company obtained financing from a core group of investors including former hedge fund manager Michael Steinhardt, Professor Jeremy Siegel of The Wharton School of the University of Pennsylvania and James D Robinson IV with venture capital firm of RRE Ventures. Michael Steinhardt became Chairman and Professor Jeremy Siegel became the senior investment strategy advisor for the company.

On September 21, 2005, the company's name was changed to WisdomTree Investments, Inc. WisdomTree Investments, Inc. launched its first 20 ETFs in June 2006. On July 26, 2011, WisdomTree listed on the NASDAQ Global Select Market under the ticker: WETF.

In 2014, WisdomTree acquired a majority stake (75%) in London-based Boost ETP. The same year, it was reported that WisdomTree will invest $20 million in Boost to give it working capital to build out its European business.

In 2016, the company was included on Forbes' list of America's 50 Most Trustworthy Financial Companies. In a statement, regarding the list inclusion, Steinberg, wrote, "This recognition underscores WisdomTree’s commitment to raising the standard of transparency in financial services through the exchange-traded funds we offer, as well as our unrivaled corporate operating disclosure." In 2019, it was reported by Bloomberg News that WisdomTree Investments was considering selling the company to J.P. Morgan Chase in 2018, however, the two companies failed to reach a mutually acceptable price.

In 2022 ETFS Capital, WisdomTree's largest single shareholder with a 10.5% stake, tried to take a seat on the board of WisdomTree.  According to a 13D regulatory filing with the SEC from January 2022, ETFS Capital chairman Graham Tuckwell described what he saw as the underperformance of WisdomTree and said the company had “been unwilling to date to work constructively” toward giving him a seat on the board since discussions began.  A March 8, 2022 13D filing disclosed that another WisdomTree investor, Lion Point Capital, supported ETFS Capital’s efforts to take a seat on the board.  The filing revealed ETFS Capital and Lion Point Capital had entered into a Group Agreement to “seek changes to the composition of the board and management” of WisdomTree, with the intention to “work constructively with the issuer to arrive at a solution that puts the issuer in the best position to unlock value for the benefit of all stockholders”.

In a regulatory filing from March 14, 2022, WisdomTree issued a ‘poison pill’, officially known as a shareholder rights agreement, to prevents any investor from acquiring more than 10% of the common stock in the company until the day after the company’s annual general meeting in June or potentially until March 2023 if extended by a shareholder vote.

In March, 2022, a WisdomTree was forced to redeem all shares of 3NIS, a leveraged ETP that moved inverse nickel prices. Due to a major short squeeze for the commodity, nickel prices shot up 250% in a few days and the ETF's daily price dropped below zero. A statement from WisdomTree said "Investors should not expect to get paid for the securities they hold."

Key financial statistics

See also 
 AdvisorShares
 Ark Invest
 IShares
 PowerShares
 ETF Securities

References

External links 
 

Financial services companies established in 2006
Exchange-traded funds
Investment management companies of the United States
Companies listed on the Nasdaq
2011 initial public offerings